Manitou is an unincorporated community and census-designated place (CDP) in Hopkins County, Kentucky, United States. As of the 2010 census the population was 181. It is a small community that lies a few miles northwest of Madisonville on US 41, at its intersection with KY 630 and KY 262.

Demographics

References

Census-designated places in Kentucky